The list of ship commissionings in 1963 includes a chronological list of all ships decommissioned in 1963.


See also 

1963
 Ship commissionings